In Islam, Raising hands in Dua is the action of using hands to invoke Allah in dua.

The view of limitation
Many scholars including especially Salafis limit this practice. According to them, basing on a lack of hadiths for other instances, with a fully authenticated chain, the practice of raising hands is specific to irregular prayers for needs and the Qunut of the Witr/Fajr prayers. This view excludes the practice of regularly raising the hands as sunnah and a mustahabb act of ibadah after fardh salah accompanying a dua. These scholars however do recognize raising hands during a dua not done after salah, accepting that the Muslim should raise his hands with humility to Allah in the way instructed by the Prophet Muhammad.

A few cases of Raising the hands in Dua being regarded as a forbidden innovation (Bidʻah) are:
 Salah (except for Qunut)
 Khutbah (in specific cases)
 Tawaf
 Sa'iye
 Ruku
  
 Sujud
 Sitting in salah

The view encouraging hand-raising after salah

Some scholars, while agreeing with not raising hands in Sujud, etc. extend its scope of application. Many such scholars hold the view of praiseworthiness of consistently praying dua after fardh Salah with hands raised, as a Sunnah action. For example, according to Ahmad ibn Idris al-Fasi there is no room for debate: "there around hadiths transmitted in support of this. One finds in Tirmidhi: “In the ritual prayer you beg. You are wretched and your are humble, and at the end you raise hands and exclaim “Oh Lord, oh Lord, oh Lord!” Without this the prayer is a miscarriage” And this is manifestly true, being attested by a clear report. In the report they have established what the Messenger, God’s blessings and peace be upon him, did and ordered, and what he said about raising one’s hands."

Types
There are two ways to raise the hands to perform the Dua:
 With both hands.
 With just one index finger: This was done when Muhammad was giving advice, when he was performing a Khutbah on the minbar, and during Tashahhud.

A third type of hand-raising is used in the ritual prayer, for example in the beginning, accompanying the Takbir al-Ihram, but this is considered outside the domain of dua.

Gallery

See also 
Dhikr
Wird

References

External links

Sufism
Spiritual practice
Language and mysticism
Arabic words and phrases
Islamic belief and doctrine
Islamic terminology
Hand gestures